The Realness II is the sixth studio album by American rapper Cormega. The album was released on October 7, 2022. Serving as a sequel to his 2001 debut, The Realness. The album was first announced during the summer of 2022, with the lead single, Essential, released on August 12, 2022. 

The album features guest appearances from Nas, Lloyd Banks and Havoc of Mobb Deep.

Track listing

References

2022 albums
Cormega albums
Albums produced by Large Professor
Albums produced by Havoc (musician)
Albums produced by the Alchemist (musician)